Paul Delaney may refer to:

 Paul Delaney (hurler) (born 1966), Irish hurler
 Paul Delaney (professor) (fl. 1980s–2020s), professor of physics and astronomy at York University in Toronto
 Paul Delaney (basketball) (born 1986), American basketball player
 Paul Delaney (rugby league) (born 1971), rugby league footballer